Alfred Grünwald may refer to:
Alfred Grünwald (librettist) (1884–1951), Austrian librettist
Johannes Theodor Baargeld, pseudonym of Alfred Emanuel Ferdinand Grünwald (1892–1927), German painter and poet
Al Grunwald (1930–2011), American baseball player

See also
 Grünwald (disambiguation)